Lanshan may refer to:

Lanshan County, Yongzhou, Hunan
Lanshan District, Rizhao, Shandong
Lanshan Port
Lanshan District, Linyi, Shandong
, Lanshan District, Linyi
Lanshan, Jiangsu, town in and subdivision of Suining County, Jiangsu
Lanshan Township, subdivision of Dongzhou District, Fushun, Liaoning
Orchid or Lan Hills, Gansu, namesake of Lanzhou
Panling Lanshan, traditional Chinese attire (hanfu) for men